"Here for You" is a song by the English electronic music production duo Gorgon City. It has vocals by Laura Welsh. It was released on 26 May 2014 as a single from their first studio album, Sirens. It entered the UK Singles Chart at number seven. The song also appears on the soundtrack of the 2014 racing video game Forza Horizon 2.

Music video
The music video for the song was released on Gorgon City's YouTube channel on 20 May 2014, lasting three minutes and fifty-four seconds. By March 2016, it had received more than seven million views.

Track listing

Chart performance

Certifications

Release history

References

2014 songs
2014 singles
Gorgon City songs
Virgin EMI Records singles
Songs written by MNEK
Songs written by Kye Gibbon
Songs written by Matt Robson-Scott